Víctor Marchesini (1930–1999), born in Río Negro Province, was an Argentine lawyer and politician.

Radical Civic Union politicians
20th-century Argentine lawyers
1930 births
1999 deaths
People from Río Negro Province
Argentine people of Italian descent